Malcolm Douglas may refer to:
 Malcolm Douglas (documentary maker) (1941–2010), Australian wildlife documentary film maker and crocodile hunter
 Malcolm Douglas (politician)  (born 1941), New Zealand politician of the Labour Party
 Malcolm Douglas (illustrator) (1954–2009), British illustrator

See also
 Malcolm Douglas-Hamilton (1909–1964), Scottish nobleman
 Malcolm Douglas-Pennant, 6th Baron Penrhyn (1908–2003), Welsh peer